Louis Frédéric Wickham (28 February 1861, Paris – 14 October 1913, Mesnil-le-Roi) was a French physician and pathologist remembered for describing Wickham striae. He trained in medicine in Paris, receiving his M.D. in 1890. He studied dermatology at the Hôpital Saint-Louis in Paris before becoming physician at the Hôpital Saint-Lazare in 1897. After 1905 he worked on research into radium.

References

External links
 

French pathologists
1861 births
1913 deaths
Burials at Neuilly-sur-Seine community cemetery